
Gmina Sadkowice is a rural gmina (administrative district) in Rawa County, Łódź Voivodeship, in central Poland.

Villages
Gmina Sadkowice contains the villages and settlements of Broniew, Bujały, Celinów, Gacpary, Gogolin, Jajkowice, Kaleń, Kłopoczyn, Lewin, Lipna, Lubania, Lutobory, Nowe Lutobory, Nowe Sadkowice, Nowe Szwejki, Nowy Kaleń, Nowy Kłopoczyn, Olszowa Wola, Paprotnia, Pilawy, Przyłuski, Rokitnica-Kąty, Rudka, Rzymiec, Sadkowice, Skarbkowa, Studzianki, Szwejki Wielkie, Trębaczew, Turobowice, Władysławów, Zabłocie, Zaborze and Żelazna.

Neighbouring gminas
Gmina Sadkowice is bordered by the gminas of Biała Rawska, Błędów, Cielądz, Mogielnica, Nowe Miasto nad Pilicą and Regnów.

References
Polish official population figures 2006

Sadkowice
Rawa County